A villa is  a house.

Villa may also refer to:

Places
Villa, Rõuge Parish, a village in Rõuge Parish, Võru County, Estonia
Villa, Võru Parish, a village in Võru Parish, Võru County, Estonia
Villa, Viljandi County, a village in Viljandi Parish, Viljandi County, Estonia
Villa, Norway, an island in Flatanger municipality, Trøndelag county, Norway
Villa (Saint Vincent), a city on the island of Saint Vincent
Villa (Corvera), Asturias, Spain
Villa (Illas), Illas, Asturias, Spain
Villa, Ohio, an unincorporated community in the United States

Other uses
Villa (surname)
Villa (fly), a genus of bee flies
The Villa, a Dutch reality television show
Aso Villa or The Villa, official residence of the President of Nigeria
Villa Maria College or Villa, a college in Buffalo, New York
Aston Villa F.C. or Villa, an English Premier League football club
Villa Lidköping BK, bandy club in Lidköping, Sweden
SC Villa, an association football club from Uganda
Villa (footballer) (born 1983), full name Rodrigo Augusto Sartori Costa, Brazilian footballer

See also
Villas (disambiguation)